"Te Quiero Tanto, Tanto" is a song written and produced by Memo Mendez-Guiu and performed by Mexican pop group OV7 from their album Entrega Total (1998). It premiered as the main theme for the Mexican telenovela Mi pequeña traviesa. The album contains two versions of the song, one which references the telenovela and the other that does not. "Te Quiero Tanto, Tanto" is their only song to reach number one on the Hot Latin Songs chart in the US. In a retrospective review of the songs that reached number one on the Hot Latin Songs in 1998, Jessica Roiz of Billboard magazine called it "Such a timeless piece in every '90s child’s heart".

Charts

Weekly charts

Year-end charts

See also 
List of number-one Billboard Hot Latin Tracks of 1998
List of Billboard Latin Pop Airplay number ones of 1998

References

1997 singles
1997 songs
1990s ballads
OV7 songs
Pop ballads
Spanish-language songs
Telenovela theme songs
Sony Music Mexico singles